Swaik Lake (also known as: Khandowa Lake) is a lake located in tehsil Kallar Kahar, Chakwal District of Punjab the province of Pakistan. It can be accessed through the M2 motorway linking Lahore and Islamabad. A waterfall is also located at the lake. It is a popular tourist attraction and offers opportunities for swimming and diving.

See also 
List of lakes of Pakistan

References

Lakes of Punjab (Pakistan)
Lakes of Pakistan
Chakwal District